Pamphobeteus antinous, also known as the Bolivian blue leg bird eater or steely blue leg, was first described by Reginald Innes Pocock in 1903. It is found in the rainforests of Bolivia and Peru, and are considered to be one of the bigger tarantulas.

Description 
Females live up to 15 years, while males only live to 4. Sexual dimorphism is present in this species in two forms, females being heavier and by the coloration. Males own a very dark blue almost black carapace and a black opisthosoma covered in black hairs, with some reddish hairs near the end. Their legs are a bright metallic blue, covered in grayish hairs. Their female counterparts are entirely black.

Habitat 
They are found in the rainforests of Bolivia and Peru, where average yearly rainfall is less than 2000mm and average temperatures of 26ºC. It is home to plants such as Mistol, Bolivian Begonia and the Amazon Sword Plant. It is also home to animals such as the Jaguar, the Giant Otter and Sloths.

Behavior 
This tarantula will first try to flee at first, maybe throwing a few urticating hairs while doing such. If this continues the tarantula will probably try to accurately aim those hairs at the intruder.

References 

Spiders described in 1903
Spiders of South America
Theraphosidae